Jaimul Hasan (born 12 August 1998) is a Bangladeshi cricketer. He made his List A debut for Kala Bagan Krira Chakra in the 2017–18 Dhaka Premier Division Cricket League on 29 March 2018.

References

External links
 

1998 births
Living people
Bangladeshi cricketers
Kala Bagan Krira Chakra cricketers
Place of birth missing (living people)